Leobersdorf is a town in the Baden district of Lower Austria, Austria.

History

Early settlements

First indices of settlement in the area date back to 3000 BC.

Around 350 BC Celtic settlers found Noricum, from their word Tristis, which means rushing or dangerous, derived the name for the river Triesting which flows through Leobersdorf.

About 15 AD, Noricum was taken peacefully by the Romans. They most likely built a watchtower where the church is currently standing.

Name

Leobersdorf was first named in the Bayrische Traditionsbücher (Bavarian Traditionbooks) as Liubetsendorf around 1165 / 1174. This name possibly derives from the old-Slavic name Ljubac or the Celtic word Lewer or Loben, which means Border- or Gravehill.

The name changed over time. In 1311 it was Lewbesdorf, 1350 Leubesdorf and finally, 1588, Leobersdorf.

Population

Famous people

Ing. Viktor Kaplan worked at the Leobersdorfer Maschinenfabrik from 1901 to 1903 and developed his idea of the Kaplan turbine there.

References

External links

 Leobersdorf @ MapQuest Where to find Leobersdorf on a map
 Leobersdorf.at Homepage for Leobersdorf (German only)
 Kaplan turbine (German)
 Kaplan turbine (English)
 Leobersdorfer Maschinenfabrik AG

Cities and towns in Baden District, Austria